Hacıbozan is a village in Tarsus  district of Mersin Province, Turkey. At    it is situated in Çukurova (Cilicia of the antiquity) plains to the south of Turkish state highway  . The population of Hacıbozan was 220  as of 2012.

References

External links
Images

Villages in Tarsus District